Whittier Friends Meeting House (also known as Springville Friends Meeting House; Quaker Corners) is a historic church building at the junction of County Roads E34 and X20 in Whittier, Iowa.  It was built in 1893.

It was added to the National Register of Historic Places in 1993.  It was deemed significant in the areas of religion and architecture.  The National Register nomination noted:The building reflects the religious and architectural heritage of a small but locally significant religious group, the Conservative Wilburite Friends of Iowa. The building embodies their conception of right building, which maintained a predilection for unadorned simplicity. The meeting house meets the requirements of Criteria consideration A for significant religious properties. It is a tangible reflection of the broad patterns of Midwestern religious development. The Whittier Friends cemetery is immediately adjacent the meeting house and is included as a contributing element to the nomination.

References

Quaker meeting houses in Iowa
Churches on the National Register of Historic Places in Iowa
Churches completed in 1893
National Register of Historic Places in Linn County, Iowa
Churches in Linn County, Iowa
1893 establishments in Iowa